HD 95109 (U Carinae) is a Classical Cepheid variable, a type of variable star, in the constellation Carina. Its apparent magnitude is 6.86.

U Car is a δ Cepheid variable with a period of 38.7681 days.  It was one of the earliest Cepheids to be discovered.  It has also one of the longest periods, and hence is one of the most luminous in the class.  There are still only a few Cepheids with longer periods, including RS Puppis, SV Vulpeculae, and the unusual S Vulpeculae.

The brightness variation in U Car is caused by fundamental mode pulsations.  The radius and temperature both vary, with the radius changing by  during each cycle.  The temperature variation causes the spectral type to vary between F6 and G7.

References

Carina (constellation)
G-type supergiants
Carinae, U
095109
4276
052589
Classical Cepheid variables
F-type supergiants
Durchmusterung objects